In mathematics, a universal graph is an infinite graph that contains every  finite (or at-most-countable) graph as an induced  subgraph. A universal graph of this type was first constructed by Richard Rado and is now called the Rado graph or  random graph.  More recent work

For instance, the Henson graphs are universal in this sense for the -clique-free graphs.

so a hypercube can be said to be a universal graph for trees. However it is not the smallest such graph: it is known that there is a universal graph for -vertex trees, with only  vertices and  edges, and that this is optimal. A construction based on the planar separator theorem can be used to show that -vertex planar graphs have universal graphs with  edges, and that bounded-degree planar graphs have universal graphs with  edges. It is also possible to construct universal graphs for planar graphs that have  vertices. 
Sumner's conjecture states that tournaments are universal for polytrees, in the sense that every tournament with  vertices contains every polytree with  vertices as a subgraph.

A family  of graphs has a universal graph of polynomial size, containing every -vertex graph as an induced subgraph, if and only if it has an adjacency labelling scheme in which vertices may be labeled by -bit bitstrings such that an algorithm can determine whether two vertices are adjacent by examining their labels. For, if a universal graph of this type exists, the vertices of any graph in  may be labeled by the identities of the corresponding vertices in the universal graph, and conversely if a labeling scheme exists then a universal graph may be constructed having a vertex for every possible label.

In older mathematical terminology, the phrase "universal graph" was sometimes used to denote a complete graph.

The notion of universal graph has been adapted and used for solving mean payoff games.

References

External links
The panarborial formula, "Theorem of the Day" concerning universal graphs for trees

Graph families
Infinite graphs